The 2013 Golden Spin of Zagreb was the 46th edition of the annual senior-level international figure skating competition held in Zagreb, Croatia. It was held at the Dom Sportova on December 5–8, 2013. Medals were awarded in the disciplines of men's singles, ladies' singles, pair skating, and ice dancing.

Entries
The entries were as follows.

Medalists

Results

Men

Ladies

Pairs

Ice dancing

References

External links
 Official website

Golden Spin of Zagreb
Golden Spin Of Zagreb, 2013
Golden Spin Of Zagreb, 2013